

Election results
The following are the official and final results for the Jordanian Parliamentary Elections held on Tuesday, November 20.

Ajlun Governorate ( 2 Districts, 4 Seats)

First District: Al-Qasabah.

Second District: Kufranjeh.

Amman Governorate ( 7 Districts, 23 Seats excluding Center Bedouins Seats)

First District: Basman, Marka, and Tariq.

Second District: Al-Yarmook, Al-Naser, Ras Al-Ain, and Badr.

Third District: Al-Madina, Zahran, and Al-Abdali.

Fourth District: Al-Quaismeh, Al-Jwaida, Abu Alanda, Khraibt Al-Sooq, Jawa, Al-yadoodah, Um Qsair, Al-Muqablain, Sahab, Al-Jeezah, and Al-Muaqqar.

Fifth District: Shafa Badran, Abu Nsair, Al-Jubaiha, Swaileh, Tlaa' Al-Ali, Um Al-Summaq, and Khalda.

Sixth District: Badr Al-Jadeeda, West Umm Uthaina, Al-Diar, Al-Swaifyah, and Wadi Al-Seer.

Seventh District: Na'our.

Aqaba Governorate ( 1 Districts, 2 Seats excluding South Bedouins Seats)

Governorate of Aqaba District

Balqa Governorate ( 4 Districts, 10 Seats)

First District: Al-Qasaba, Mahis, and Fuhais.

Second District: Southern Shooneh.

Third District: Deir Alla.

Fourth District: 'Ain al-Basha.

Irbid Governorate ( 9 Districts, 16 Seats)

First District: al-Qasabah.

Second District: Bani Obayd .

Third District: Northern Mazar.

Fourth District: Ar Ramtha.

Fifth District: Bni Kanana

Sixth District: Kora.

Seventh District: Northern Aghwar.

Eighth District: Tayybeh

Ninth District: Wastiyyeh

Jerash Governorate ( 1 District, 4 Seats)

Governorate of Jerash District

Kerak Governorate ( 6 Districts, 10 Seats)

First District Al Qasabah.

Second District: al-Qaser

Third District: Southern Mazar.

Fourth District: Southern Aghwar.

Fifth District: 'Ayy.

Sixth District Faqqu.

Ma'an Governorate ( 3 Districts, 4 Seats excluding South Bedouins Seats)

First District: al-Qasabah.

Second District: al-Shawbak.

Third District: Petra

Madaba Governorate ( 2 Districts, 4 Seats)

First District: al-Qasabeh

Second District: Dhiban.

Mafraq Governorate ( 1 District, 4 Seats excluding North Bedouins Seats)

First District

Tafilah Governorate ( 2 Districts, 4 Seats)

First District: al-Qasabah.

Second District: Bisairah.

Zarqa Governorate ( 4 Districts, 10 Seats)

First District

Second District

Third District

Fourth District

North Bedouin Tribes Closed District ( 3 Seats)

Center Bedouin Tribes Closed District ( 3 Seats)

South Bedouin Tribes Closed District ( 3 Seats)

Woman Minimum Quota ( National District, 6 Seats)

See also 
Jordanian parliamentary election results, 2013
2007 Jordanian parliamentary election
2003 Jordanian parliamentary election

References

External links
Ministry of the Interior- Temporary Election Law 34 2001

Elections in Jordan
2007 elections in Asia
2007 in Jordan
2007